Guadalupita is an unincorporated community located in Mora County, New Mexico, United States. Guadalupita has a post office with ZIP code 87722, which opened on November 25, 1879.

The village of Guadalupita is included in the Guadalupita-Coyote Rural Historic District which was listed on the National Register of Historic Places in 2017.

References

Unincorporated communities in Mora County, New Mexico
Unincorporated communities in New Mexico